André Gonçalves (15th century/16th century), Portuguese explorer that accompanied Pedro Álvares Cabral in the discovery of Brazil.  Gonçalves was one of Cabral's captains of the fleet.

See also
Exploration of Asia

Maritime history of Portugal
Portuguese explorers of South America
15th-century Portuguese people
16th-century Portuguese people
16th-century explorers